William Emerson Brock (March 14, 1872August 5, 1950) was a Democratic United States Senator from Tennessee from 1929 to 1931.

Life and career
Brock was born in Davie County, North Carolina, the son of Mary Ann (Howell) and Richard Emerson Brock. He attended public school and engaged in agricultural pursuits until 1894.  He then moved to Winston-Salem, North Carolina, and became a clerk in a general store.

From 1896 until 1901 he worked as a tobacco salesman. In 1909 he moved to Chattanooga, Tennessee. In Chattanooga, Brock became involved in candy manufacturing, and also had involvements in insurance and banking interests. He became a trustee of the former University of Chattanooga, now the University of Tennessee at Chattanooga, Emory and Henry College, and also Martha Washington College.

On September 2, 1929, the Governor of Tennessee, Henry Hollis Horton, appointed Brock to the vacancy in the U.S. Senate caused by the death of Lawrence D. Tyson; Horton had first offered the appointment to former Senator Luke Lea, who declined. On November 4, 1930, Brock was elected to the balance of this term. He did not run for the full six-year term that was on the ballot at the same time, and his service as a U.S. senator ended on March 3, 1931. He was succeeded by Cordell Hull.

After leaving the Senate, Brock returned to his Chattanooga candy manufacturing business and remained involved in its operation until his death in 1950.  He was buried at Forest Hills Cemetery in Chattanooga.

Brock's grandson, William Emerson Brock III, was a Republican member of the U.S. House of Representatives and a U.S. senator from Tennessee.

References

William Emerson Brock (1872-1950) at Political Graveyard

External links
 

1872 births
1950 deaths
Democratic Party United States senators from Tennessee
Tennessee Democrats
Businesspeople in confectionery
Businesspeople from Tennessee
People from Mocksville, North Carolina
Politicians from Chattanooga, Tennessee